A Matter of Time is the second and final studio album by American country music artist Jason Sellers. Its title track was a Top 40 hit for him on the Billboard Hot Country Songs charts in 1999. One day after the album's release, Sellers exited BNA Records' roster.

Content
The track "That's Not Her Picture" was later recorded by John Michael Montgomery on his 2000 album Brand New Me, while "Bad Case of Missing You" would later be recorded by The Oak Ridge Boys on their 2004 album The Journey, from which it was released as a single. "Every Fire" was originally recorded by Shenandoah on its 1994 album In the Vicinity of the Heart. "Golden Ring" is a cover version of the George Jones and Tammy Wynette duet that went to Number One in 1976.

Critical reception
Philip van Vleck of Allmusic gave the album four-and-a-half stars out of five, saying "It's the uptempo tracks that have made this project an effort that supersedes his first album in every aspect."

Track listing

Personnel

 Walt Aldridge – bouzouki
 Eddie Bayers – percussion
 Jim "Moose" Brown – piano, keyboards
 J. T. Corenflos – electric guitar
 Stuart Duncan – fiddle
 Pat Flynn – acoustic guitar
 Steve Hinson – pedal steel guitar, lap steel guitar
 Jim Hoke – harmonica
 Jeff King – electric guitar
 Greg Morrow – drums
 Steve Nathan – piano, synthesizer, B-3 organ, Wurlitzer
 Danny Parks – electric guitar
 Michael Rhodes – bass guitar
 Tom Roady – percussion
 Brent Rowan – electric guitar
 Scotty Sanders – pedal steel guitar
 Darrell Scott – acoustic guitar, mandolin
 Jason Sellers – vocals, bass guitar, electric guitar
 Leland Sklar – bass guitar

Background vocals

Bekka Bramlett - tracks 2, 6, 9
Melodie Crittenden - tracks 3, 5, 7
Austin Cunningham - track 3
Sonya Isaacs - tracks 6, 10
Mary Ann Kennedy - track 1
Alison Krauss - track 8
Jamie O'Neal - track 1
Cindy Richardson Walker - tracks 2, 9
Jason Sellers - all tracks except 8
Steven Sellers - track 3, 5
Ricky Skaggs - track 8
Lee Ann Womack - track 4

Technical
Walt Aldridge - production
Jim DeMain - recording, mixing
John Guess - recording, mixing
Ken Love - mastering

References

1999 albums
BNA Records albums
Jason Sellers albums